Carbyl sulfate is an organosulfur compound. The white solid is the product of the reaction of sulfur trioxide and ethylene.  It is used in preparation of some dyes and other organosulfur compounds. Carbyl sulfate is a colorless, crystalline, hygroscopic substance although commercial product can appear as a liquid.  Because of its unpleasant properties carbyl sulfate is difficult to handle and is usually not isolated but further processed to give secondary products.

Production
Regnault and Heinrich Gustav Magnus reported first in the years 1838 to 1839 on the compound as reaction product of anhydrous ethanol and anhydrous sulfuric acid.

Carbyl sulfate is produced in the highly exothermic (about 800 kcal/kg) reaction of ethylene and sulfur trioxide in the vapor phase in nearly quantitative yield.

 

Disulfuric acid and chlorosulfuric acid can also be used as a sulfonating agent, replacing sulfur trioxide.  Instead of ethylene, ethylene-forming agents can be used, e.g. ethanol or diethyl ether.

The product of industrial processes is a  water-clear liquid which has - in accordance with D.S. Breslow (107.5 to 109 °C) - a melting range from 102 to 108 °C. Previously stated melting point of about 80 °C  results from adhering sulfur trioxide.

Reactions and use
As a cyclic sulfate ester, it is an alkylating agent.  Hydrolysis affords ethionic acid, which retains one sulfate ester group. Ethionic acid undergoes further hydrolysis to isethionic acid:

Carbyl sulfate is used as precursor for vinylsulfonic acid and sodium vinyl sulfonate, which are important activated alkenes and are used e. g. as anionic comonomers. A number of functional compounds with a variety of applications are available by nucleophilic addition at the activated double bond of the vinyl sulfonic acid and its derivatives.

Safety
The material is highly reactive.  It can decompose explosively when heated above 170 °C.

References

Further reading
 

Sulfonates
Sulfate esters